Ontong Java Atoll or Luangiua, (formerly Lord Howe Atoll, not to be confused with Lord Howe Island)  is one of the largest atolls on earth.

Description
Administratively Ontong Java belongs to Solomon Islands.
The closest land, however, is Nukumanu Atoll, which lies only  due north of Ontong Java's northern tip and, though historically closely related to Ontong Java, is now under the administration of Papua New Guinea.

Ontong Java is roughly boot-shaped. The islands are mostly low-lying coral formations, the highest elevation being .

Approximately 2000 people live on the atoll. There are two main villages where the population is concentrated with 1,386 on the island of Luaniua in the eastern end and 689 on Pelau in the northeast.

History

The islands were first inhabited by Polynesians approximately 2000 years ago. The main cultural and commercial exchanges took place with the inhabitants of neighboring Nukumanu Atoll, with whom Ontong Java people share many cultural affinities.

It is likely that first European sighting was by the Spanish expedition of Álvaro de Mendaña on 1 February 1568. It was charted by them as Bajos de la Candelaria (shoals of Our Lady of Candlemas in Spanish). The following verifiable sighting by Europeans was by Abel Tasman in 1643 who named it Ontong Java; however, it wasn't until 1791 that Europeans set foot on the islands, when Capt. John Hunter (later Governor of New South Wales) named it Lord Howe Atoll. In 1893 the islands were annexed by Germany and ceded to Great Britain in 1899.

Today the atoll's inhabitants make a subsistence living by means of coconut and taro (root) cultivation, as well as fishing. Until a ban in 2005, the primary source of income was beche de mer and trochus shells, which were shipped to Hong Kong. The inhabitants are also involved in copra production. It also has a prolific number of sea birds, including the black-naped tern, which uses Ontong Java Atoll as a breeding site.

Anthropology and linguistics

Ontong Java is a Polynesian outlier. The inhabitants retain a Polynesian character despite their location in the Melanesian Archipelago of Solomon Islands. In former times both men and women wore elaborate tattoos all over their bodies. Two dialects of one language are spoken in this atoll, Luangiua and Pelau. This language belongs to the Polynesian stock.

Ontong Java was visited by English missionary George Brown in mid 19th century. Brown described the population as Polynesian and referred to the place as Lua Niua. He recorded the existence of a two-class system in Ontong Java and, based on it, inferred that it was probable that exogamous classes formerly existed in Samoa as well.

The first detailed research on Ontong Java's inhabitants, however, was conducted by German ethnographers Ernst Sarfert and Hans Damm, during a German scientific expedition of the Southern Seas that took place in 1908–1910. This expedition visited both Ontong Java and neighboring Nukumanu Atoll, where they also carried out their research. Their work, "Luangiua und Nukumanu" was published in 1931. Sarfert and Damm claimed that both names of the atoll, Lord Howe and Ontong Java, were incorrect and called this atoll Luangiua in their works.

Jack London first called this atoll "Oolong". Later he would write in one of his novels: 

Ontong Java was later visited by Sydney University anthropologist Herbert Ian Hogbin in 1927. Hogbin's study of Ontong Java was published in 1934.

In religious terms, Ontong Java is part of the Anglican Church of Melanesia Diocese of Malaita.

See also
Ontong Java Plateau
Ontong Java Flying Fox

References

Bibliography
 Hogbin, H. Ian. "The Social Organization of Ontong Java." London 1931
 Hogbin, H. Ian. "Transition Rites at Ontong Java." Oceania 1: 399–425. 1930
 Sarfert, Ernst, and Hans Damm. "Luangiua und Nukumanu." Ergebnisse der Südsee Expedition, 1908–1910. Hamburg 1931

External links

 Ontong Java (2020) Documentary
 Ontong Java
Melanesians and Polynesians. Their Life-Histories described and compared. By George Brown, D.D American Anthropologist

Polynesian outliers
Atolls of the Solomon Islands